From My Heart is the second studio album by American country music singer Kathy Mattea. It was released in 1985 on Mercury Records. Singles from the album include "It's Your Reputation Talkin'", "He Won't Give In" and "Heart of the Country". Like her self-titled debut before it, From My Heart peaked at #42 on the Top Country Albums charts. "Ball and Chain" is a cover of an Elton John song, from his 1982 album Jump Up!.

Track listing

Personnel
Kathy Mattea – lead vocals, background vocals, acoustic guitar

Musicians
 Mark Casstevens – acoustic guitar
 Charles Cochran – organ, piano
 Sonny Garrish – pedal steel guitar
 John Barlow Jarvis – piano
 Chris Leuzinger – electric guitar
 Hargus "Pig" Robbins – organ, piano
 Brent Rowan – electric guitar
 Milton Sledge – drums
 Bobby Wood – organ
Bob Wray – bass guitar

String Section
 George Binkley III – violin
 Roy Christensen – cello
 Carl Gorodetzky – violin
 Gary Van Osdale – viola

Additional Singer
Jonathan Edwards – background vocals
Mac McAnally – background vocals
Pat McManus – background vocals
Jim Photoglo – background vocals
Allen Reynolds – background vocals
John Thompson – background vocals
Wendy Waldman – background vocals

Production notes
Produced by Allen Reynolds
Mastered by John Eberle
Duke Duczer – assistant engineer, mixing
Mark Miller – engineer, mixing

Chart performance

Release history

References

1985 albums
Kathy Mattea albums
Mercury Nashville albums
Albums produced by Allen Reynolds